Kızılöz may refer to the following villages in Turkey:

 Kızılöz, Çubuk
 Kızılöz, Dursunbey
 Kızılöz, Osmaneli
 Kızılöz, Samsat